Dixie Jane D'Amelio (born August 12, 2001) is an American singer and social media personality known for her videos on TikTok. She is the elder sister of Charli D'Amelio. She was born in Norwalk, Connecticut. In 2020, she starred in the YouTube web series Attaway General.  she has over 57.5 million followers and 3.3 billion likes on TikTok, 24.2 million followers on Instagram, and 7.04 million subscribers and 619.12 million views on YouTube, where she also hosts a talk show called The Early Late Night Show. In 2020, she signed a record deal with HitCo Entertainment and began releasing her own music.

Early life
Dixie Jane D'Amelio was born on August 12, 2001, to parents Marc, a 2018 Republican candidate for the Connecticut State Senate, and photographer and former model Heidi, D'Amelio. She is the elder sister of fellow TikTok personality Charli D'Amelio.

Career
D'Amelio’s rise to prominence happened at the same time as her sister, Charli D'Amelio, both gaining popularity on TikTok. In January 2020, D'Amelio signed with United Talent Agency. In May 2020, she and her sister announced a new podcast deal with Ramble Podcast Network, which will offer a behind-the-scenes look at their lives and specific topics on their minds. This podcast was called 2 Chix.  D'Amelio's acting career includes appearing on the Brat TV series Attaway General. On June 26, 2020, D'Amelio released her first single, "Be Happy". As of August 28, 2021, the song has accumulated more than 86.1 million streams on Spotify.

On August 7, 2020, she signed a record deal with L.A. Reid's label HitCo Entertainment. Forbes published a report in August 2020 revealing D'Amelio earned $2.9 million in the last year through June from her numerous sponsorship deals and merchandise, making her the third highest-earning TikTok star. In December 2020, D'Amelio released her singles "One Whole Day" with Wiz Khalifa and "Roommates", the latter of which was co-penned by Demi Lovato. "Psycho", featuring Kentucky rapper Rubi Rose, was released in 2021 peaking at 25 on the US pop charts.

D'Amelio released her debut album A Letter to Me on June 10, 2022. She is set to be one of the opening acts on the Forever Tour for American boy band Big Time Rush to promote her debut album.

Personal life
In October 2020, D'Amelio confirmed she was in a relationship with social media personality Noah Beck. D'Amelio and Beck broke up in late 2022.

Filmography

Discography

Studio albums

Singles

Awards and nominations

See also
 List of most-followed TikTok accounts

Notes

References

External links
 
 

2001 births
21st-century American singers
21st-century American women singers
American people of Italian descent
American TikTokers
American YouTubers
Living people
People from Norwalk, Connecticut
Singers from Connecticut
Social media influencers